Wolf Creek is a stream in Cass County in the U.S. state of Missouri. It is a tributary of the East Branch South Grand River.

Wolf Creek was named due to the presence of wolves along its course.

See also
List of rivers of Missouri

References

Rivers of Cass County, Missouri
Rivers of Missouri